Fern Rock is a neighborhood in the upper North Philadelphia section of Philadelphia, Pennsylvania bounded by Olney to the east, Ogontz to the west, Logan to the south, and East Oak Lane to the north. It is approximately situated between Broad Street, Tabor Road, 7th Street, Godfrey Avenue and Fisher Park. Fern Rock borders Ogontz at Broad Street, Logan at Olney Avenue, East Oak Lane at Godfrey Avenue, and Olney at the train tracks.  

The northern terminus of the Broad Street Line subway is located in Fern Rock at the Fern Rock Transportation Center. Three SEPTA Regional Rail lines also run through this station. 

The Pennsylvania College of Optometry is located in the 1200 block of West Godfrey Avenue. 

The area is a mix of 1920s-style row homes, a few high-rise apartment buildings near York and Chelten, some older twins and single homes, especially near 13th St and Spencer St, formerly known as Green Lane, along with various commercial strips along Broad Street, Olney Avenue in and around Broad Street, and the 5700-5900 block of Old York Road.

Etymology of the name Fern Rock

The neighborhood is named after the ancestral estate of Elisha Kent Kane, a renowned arctic explorer and naval surgeon from Philadelphia.

Demographics

The neighborhood is a fairly stable, predominantly Black-American area.

Education

Pennsylvania College of Optometry (Eye Institute) and Community College of Philadelphia (Northwest Center) are located in the Fern Rock neighborhood. There are also colleges within a short distance:  La Salle University (Logan), Salus University (Elkins Park), and Gratz College (Melrose Park).

References

Neighborhoods in Philadelphia
Olney-Oak Lane, Philadelphia